Eternal Rest or Requiem aeternam is a Western Christian prayer asking God:

(1) to hasten the progression of the souls of the faithful departed in Purgatory to their place in Heaven (in Roman Catholicism)
(2) to rest in the love of God the souls of the faithful departed in Paradise until the resurrection of the dead and Last Judgement (in Catholicism, Anglicanism, Methodism, Lutheranism)

The prayer is cited from 2 Esdras (4 Esdras Vulgate):

Therefore I say to you, O nations that hear and understand, “Wait for your shepherd; he will give you everlasting rest, because he who will come at the end of the age is close at hand. Be ready for the rewards of the kingdom, because perpetual light will shine on you forevermore.
-2 Esdras 2:34-35 NRSV

Theology 

This Roman Catholic doctrine is found in the Catechism of the Catholic Church, paragraphs 1030-1032:

°The United Methodist Church teaches the "truth of intercessory prayer for the dead" and that "prayer for the dead has been a widespread practice throughout Christian history [and] is a profound act of love addressed to a God of love".
′

Text

Latin
The Latin text in the Roman Rite of the Catholic Church is:

℣. Requiem æternam dona ei (eis), Domine
℟. Et lux perpetua luceat ei (eis):
℣. Requiescat (-ant) in pace.
℟. Amen.

English
The translation used by English-speaking Roman Catholics is:

℣. Eternal rest, grant unto him/her (them), O ,
℟. And let perpetual light shine upon him/her (them).
℣. May he/she (they) rest in peace.
℟. Amen.

The translation used by English-speaking Lutherans is:

℣. Rest eternal grant him/her, O ;
℟. and let light perpetual shine upon him/her.
℣. May he/she rest in peace.
℟. Amen.

The translation used by English-speaking Anglicans is:

℣. Rest eternal grant unto them, O :
℟. and let light perpetual shine upon them.
℣. May they rest in peace.
℟. Amen.

A variation of the prayer said by American Methodist clergy during A Service of Death and Resurrection is:

Eternal God,
we praise you for the great company of all those
who have finished their course in faith
and now rest from their labor.
We praise you for those dear to us
whom we name in our hearts before you.
Especially we praise you for Name,
whom you have graciously received into your presence.
To all of these, grant your peace.
Let perpetual light shine upon them;
and help us so to believe where we have not seen,
that your presence may lead us through our years,
and bring us at last with them
into the joy of your home
not made with hands but eternal in the heavens;
through Jesus Christ our Lord. Amen.

See also

Allhallowtide
Requiem Mass
Office of the Dead
Rest in peace
In Paradisum

References

Christian prayer
Roman Catholic prayers